In mathematics, Zahorski's theorem is a theorem of real analysis. It states that a necessary and sufficient condition for a subset of the real line to be the set of points of non-differentiability of a continuous real-valued function, is that it be the union of a Gδ set and a  set of zero measure.

References
.
.

Theorems in real analysis